Santa Claus, popularly known as the Buttplug Gnome, is a 2001 statue by Paul McCarthy in the Eendrachtsplein square of Rotterdam, The Netherlands.

Originally made for the International Sculpture Collection with the intended location being outside the De Doelen concert hall, it has been located in various places – including the courtyard of the Boijmans Museum – but moved due to protests from local businesses. Officially the work represents Santa Claus holding a Christmas tree in his hands but the artist has implied that it could also represent a buttplug, and that "...For me, the sculpture is also about the consumer community - as a commentary on material consumption in the Western world." A red version was unveiled in May 2018 in Oslo, Norway. The unveiling was done by a man pulling off the cover, suspended by an overhead crane with hooks through his skin.

References

See also 
 Tree (installation), also by McCarthy

Public art in the Netherlands
Art in Rotterdam
Santa Claus